The year 1980 was the 199th year of the Rattanakosin Kingdom of Thailand. It was the 35th year in the reign of King Bhumibol Adulyadej (Rama IX), and is reckoned as year 2523 in the Buddhist Era.

Incumbents
King: Bhumibol Adulyadej 
Crown Prince: Vajiralongkorn
Prime Minister: 
 until 3 March: Kriangsak Chamanan 
starting 3 March: Prem Tinsulanonda
Supreme Patriarch: Jinavajiralongkorn

 
Years of the 20th century in Thailand
Thailand
Thailand
1980s in Thailand